Kočí (coachman in Czech) may refer to:

Places
Kočí (Chrudim District), a municipality and village in the Czech Republic

Czech people
 David Kočí, ice hockey player 
 Přemysl Kočí, artist
 Václav Kočí, ice hockey player
 Irena Kočí, politician
 Boris Kočí, footballer

Czech-language surnames
Occupational surnames